Association of Turanian Hunters were Hungarian fascist paramilitary organization founded in 1927 by Gyula Gömbös after the defeat of Austro-Hungary in World War I The ideology of the organisation included restoration of Hungary to its pre-Trianon borders, racism (in form of Hungarian Turanism), anticommunism and antisemitism. It is estimated that the organisation at its peak in 1944 had approximately 43,000 members in some 1200 settlements.

In occupied Bačka, branches of this organisation were founded especially after the Novi Sad raid of 1942. 

Turanists organisations were opposed to German National Socialism, considering Aryan race inferior. When Nazi Germany occupied Hungary in 1944 in Operation Margarethe in order to prevent Hungary to join Western Allies, there were clashes between Hungarians and the German population. When Turanian hunters armed themselves to defend Hungarianism, they were intermediately disarmed by the Wehrmacht. Newly appointed Minister of Interior Andor Jaross decided to disband the organisation. However, it was officially disestablished only in 1949.

After Yugoslav partisans and the Red Army liberated territories previously occupied by Hungary, some former members of the Turanian hunters were executed.

References

Literature 
 
 

Antiziganism in Hungary
Antisemitism in Hungary
Fascism in Hungary
Hungarian Turanism
1949 disestablishments in Hungary
1927 establishments in Hungary
Paramilitary organizations